Edwin James Lowrey (August 13, 1891 – November 27, 1973) was a Canadian ice hockey centre. Lowrey played for Ottawa Senators, Toronto Ontarios, Montreal Canadiens, Toronto Blueshirts, Hamilton Tigers and the Regina Capitals. Lowrey later became the coach of the University of Michigan ice hockey team.

Eddie Lowrey was the older brother of NHL alumni players Fred and Gerry Lowrey. Three other younger brothers – Tom, Frank and Bill – played with lower level teams in the Ottawa City Hockey League.

He was the last surviving former player of the Toronto Ontarios.

Playing career
Born in Manotick, Ontario near Ottawa, Lowrey played junior hockey for the Ottawa Stewartons (1909–10, 1911–12), Hull Volants (1909–10), Ottawa Buena Vistas (1910–11), Ottawa New Edinburghs (1912–13) before becoming a professional with the Ottawa Senators in 1912. He played one season for the Senators before being traded to the Toronto Ontarios in January 1914. He played one season with Toronto. From 1914 until 1916, Lowrey played in the NHA as a spare, playing one game for Montreal and four for Ottawa in 1914–15. In 1915–16, he played two games for the Toronto Blueshirts. In 1916, he played a full season with the Senators and remained with the Senators until 1919. He played for the Senators during the inaugural season of the National Hockey League in 1917-18 and was one of the original NHL players.

Coaching career
His coaching career began in 1919–20 with Ottawa Munitions of the Ottawa City Hockey League before returning to playing for two seasons, one with the Hamilton Tigers and one with the Regina Capitals. In 1922, he joined the University of Ottawa as ice hockey coach.

He became the head coach of the University of Michigan hockey team from 1927 to 1944 and compiled a 124–136–21 record as Michigan's coach.  In August 1944, Lowrey was notified by the University of Michigan Board of Athletic Control that he was being released effective in November 1944 for economy reasons.  His grandson Mike Lowrey became an assistant hockey coach at the University of Tennessee.

Career statistics

Regular season and playoffs

College Coaching Record

References

External links
 

1891 births
1973 deaths
Canadian ice hockey centres
Hamilton Tigers (ice hockey) players
Ice hockey people from Ottawa
Michigan Wolverines men's ice hockey coaches
Montreal Canadiens (NHA) players
Ottawa Senators (1917) players
Ottawa Senators (NHA) players
Ottawa Senators (original) players
Regina Capitals players
Toronto Blueshirts players
Toronto Ontarios players